William Pizzuto is an American Republican Party politician currently serving as a member of the Connecticut House of Representatives from the 71st district, which includes the town of Middlebury and part of the city of Waterbury, since 2022. Following the 2021 resignation of Anthony D'Amelio, Pizzuto was elected to the seat in a February 2022 special election over Democrat John Egan. Pizzuto formerly served as the campus director for the University of Connecticut's Waterbury campus.

References

People from Middlebury, Connecticut
Republican Party members of the Connecticut House of Representatives
Living people
Year of birth missing (living people)